Les Reaney (born July 8, 1984) is a Canadian former professional ice hockey centre.

Career
Reaney began his career in the ECHL for the Stockton Thunder and the Dayton Bombers before joining the Rapid City Rush of the Central Hockey League. In the 2009-10 season, Reaney scored 86 points for the Rush, 28 goals and 58 assists, and was named into the CHL All-Star team.

In 2012, Reaney moved to the Wichita Thunder of the CHL for one season before moving to Europe. He signed for the Edinburgh Capitals in the United Kingdom's Elite Ice Hockey League the following season, but departed after just seven league games and finished the season in The Netherlands with HYS The Hague. He retired from professional hockey at the conclusion of the season.

Awards and honours

References

External links

1984 births
Alberni Valley Bulldogs players
Canadian ice hockey centres
Dayton Bombers players
Edinburgh Capitals players
HYS The Hague players
Ice hockey people from Saskatchewan
Living people
Niagara Purple Eagles men's ice hockey players
Rapid City Rush players
Salmon Arm Silverbacks players
Stockton Thunder players
Vernon Vipers players
Wichita Thunder players
Canadian expatriate ice hockey players in England
Canadian expatriate ice hockey players in Scotland
Canadian expatriate ice hockey players in the Netherlands